Leiocephalus cubensis, commonly known as the Cuban brown curlytail or Cuban curlytail lizard , is a species of lizard in the family Leiocephalidae (curly-tailed lizard). It is native to Cuba.

References

Leiocephalus
Reptiles described in 1840
Reptiles of Cuba
Taxa named by John Edward Gray
Endemic fauna of Cuba